Bai Hui-yun (born 9 April 1973) is a Taiwanese table tennis player. She competed in the women's doubles event at the 1996 Summer Olympics.

References

1973 births
Living people
Taiwanese female table tennis players
Olympic table tennis players of Taiwan
Table tennis players at the 1996 Summer Olympics
Place of birth missing (living people)
20th-century Taiwanese women